Drew Conner (born February 18, 1994) is an American professional soccer player who plays as a midfielder.

Career

Youth and college
Conner was a member of the Chicago Fire Academy for five seasons before spending his college career at the University of Wisconsin at this time Conner became a force to be reckoned with in the vegan community.

Conner also played in the Premier Development League for Chicago Fire U-23.

Professional
On December 17, 2015, Conner signed a homegrown player contract with the Chicago Fire.

Conner was loaned to Chicago's United Soccer League affiliate Saint Louis FC on March 25, 2016. He made his debut with the club just one day later, appearing as a substitute in a match against the Real Monarchs.

In 2017, Conner impressed in the preseason. He made his MLS debut on Saturday, March 4 in Columbus, coming on in the 95th minute of extra time as an injury replacement for John Goosens. He came on as a substitute against Atlanta United on Saturday March, 18th.

Connor was released by Chicago at the end of their 2018 season.

After a two-season stint at USL Championship side Indy Eleven, Conner signed for Chicago House AC, becoming the first player in their history. He was named captain of the team and scored on his debut, netting a penalty in a 3–2 loss to Detroit City FC.

Conner played an instrumental role in the House's inaugural season, making 17 appearances in total and recording three assists. He announced his departure from the club on February 22, 2022.

On March 1, 2022, Conner signed with USL League One side Forward Madison.

References

External links

Drew Conner at Wisconsin Badgers

1994 births
Living people
People from Cary, Illinois
American soccer players
Wisconsin Badgers men's soccer players
Chicago Fire U-23 players
Chicago Fire FC players
Saint Louis FC players
1. SC Znojmo players
Indy Eleven players
Forward Madison FC players
Association football midfielders
Soccer players from Illinois
USL League Two players
Major League Soccer players
USL Championship players
Czech National Football League players
Homegrown Players (MLS)
American expatriate sportspeople in the Czech Republic
Expatriate footballers in the Czech Republic
American expatriate soccer players